Costoanachis avara, common name the greedy dove shell, is a species of sea snail, a marine gastropod mollusk in the family Columbellidae, the dove snails.

Description
The length of the shell varies between 8 mm and 19 mm.

Distribution
This species occurs in the Northwest Atlantic Ocean from Massachusetts to Florida; in the Gulf of Mexico and in the Caribbean Sea.

References

 Abbott, R.T. (1974). American Seashells. 2nd ed. Van Nostrand Reinhold: New York, NY (USA). 663 pp
 Rosenberg, G., F. Moretzsohn, and E. F. García. 2009. Gastropoda (Mollusca) of the Gulf of Mexico, pp. 579–699 in Felder, D.L. and D.K. Camp (eds.), Gulf of Mexico–Origins, Waters, and Biota. Biodiversity. Texas A&M Press, College Station, Texas.

External links
 Pollock, L.W. (1998). A practical guide to the marine animals of northeastern North America. Rutgers University Press. New Brunswick, New Jersey & London. 367 pp
 

Columbellidae
Gastropods described in 1822